Thomas McCurtains is a Gaelic Athletic Association club based in Goodmayes, East London. The club covers a wide area and current players live in many different areas, including, Stratford, Canary Wharf, Liverpool St, Shoreditch, Old St, Dalston, Hackney, Forest Gate, Gants Hill, Woodford, Leyton, Leytonstone, Romford, Dagenham & Brentwood as well as many other areas. The club was founded in 1920, making it one of London's oldest GAA clubs.

The club offers hurling, camogie, gaelic football, ladies' football and GAA handball from under-8s up to adults.

History
The club was founded in 1920 from members of the Forest Gate Branch of the Gaelic League. It soon adopted the name of Tomás Mac Curtain, in honour of the late Lord Mayor of Cork whom members of the Royal Irish Constabulary (RIC) shot dead during the Irish War of Independence, but the club was often referred to as Forest Gate in the early days. McCurtains' first fixtures came in 1921 when the club entered the first London GAA league and championship competitions to be played after the First World War in both hurling and football, with games being played in Manor Park Athletic Grounds. It is thought that the players trained on Wanstead Flats, though this is unconfirmed.

The club moved to The Leys, Ballards Road, Dagenham, at the bequest of Ford's Dagenham, some time during the 1930s. In 1934 the club won its first Senior Football Championship and retained its title the following year (1935). The club disbanded at the start of the Second World War and did not reform until 1948. It was at this time that the club was known as Hibernians, after a dance hall which members attended and a potential sponsor. In the early 1950s (possibly 1952), the club reverted to using the name Thomas McCurtains. In 1955 the newly crowned All-Ireland Senior Hurling Championship winner, Cork (featuring Christy Ring), travelled to Dagenham and played a "Dagenham Select" team, which consisted heavily of McCurtains players.

The club won multiple championships at junior and intermediate grades in both codes over the decades, before winning the Senior Hurling Championship in 1987. With the upturn of economic fortunes in Ireland and the emergence of the Celtic Tiger economy, the GAA in London struggled as many Gaels returned home. Thus the club struggled on the pitch during the 1990s.

Around the turn of the century, the club relocated once more to Goodmayes Hospital Sports Grounds, where it currently resides. This brought with it success in the 2000s, with the club winning more championships, including the All-Britain Junior Hurling Championship in 2005. More recently, a Ladies Football Club was founded in 2011, while a Camogie Club followed in 2016.

Honours
Hurling
 London Senior Hurling Championship (1): 1987
 London Intermediate Hurling Championship (6): 1966, 1975, 2001, 2005, 2008, 2018
 London Junior Hurling Championship (3): 1950 (as Hibernians), 1965, 1971
 All Britain Club Junior Hurling Championship (1): 2005
Gaelic Football
 London Senior Football Championship (2): 1934, 1935
 London Intermediate Football Championship (3): 1984, 2007, 2019
 London Junior Football Championship (3): 1966, 1980, 2017
 All Britain Club Junior Football Championship (1): 2019
Ladies Gaelic Football
 London Junior Ladies Football Championship (4): 2012, 2014, 2015, 2020
Camogie
 All Britain Intermediate Camogie Championship (1): 2020
 All Britain Junior Camogie Championship (2): 2016, 2022
Handball
 Connacht Senior One Wall Championship (1): Colm Grace - 2022

References

External links
 Thomas McCurtains Website
 Thomas McCurtains Facebook Page
 Thomas McCurtains Twitter Page

Gaelic Athletic Association clubs in Britain
Gaelic Athletic Association clubs in London
Gaelic football clubs in Britain
Hurling clubs in London GAA
Hurling clubs in Britain
Sport in the London Borough of Redbridge